Jamie Peterkin (born February 28, 1982) is a male swimmer from Castries, Saint Lucia. He swam for Saint Lucia in the 2000 Summer Olympics, finishing 59th in the 50-meter freestyle. He is a member of the University of Kentucky swimming team, specializing in the 50- and 100-meter freestyle events.

References

1982 births
Living people
Olympic swimmers of Saint Lucia
Swimmers at the 2000 Summer Olympics
Swimmers at the 2002 Commonwealth Games
Swimmers at the 2003 Pan American Games
Kentucky Wildcats men's swimmers
Commonwealth Games competitors for Saint Lucia
Pan American Games competitors for Saint Lucia
Saint Lucian expatriate sportspeople in the United States